is a Japanese manga series written and illustrated by Shiwo Komeyama. It originated as a one-shot published in 2007. It later became a full series, which was serialized in Square Enix's Monthly Shōnen Gangan from February 2009 to July 2015. The chapters of the series were collected into twelve volumes.

Publication
The series is written and illustrated by Shiwo Komeyama. It started as a one-shot published by Komeyama, under the pen name Aoi Mizuki, in Square Enix's Monthly Shōnen Gangan magazine on June 12, 2007. The manga was serialized in the same magazine from February 12, 2009, to July 10, 2015. The series was collected into twelve tankōbon volumes.

In April 2013, Yen Press announced they licensed the series for English publication.

Volume list

Reception
Rebecca Silverman from Anime News Network praised the first volume for its action and plot, while criticizing the art for being "too bright" and stating that it "lacks backgrounds". Reviewing for Otaku USA, Jason Thompson also praised the action and compared it to that of D.Gray-man, while criticizing the story and character, calling the story "repetitive" and stating the characters "[only have] four moods: snark, angst, fighting, and making out". Like Silverman and Thompson, Sean Gaffney from A Case Suitable for Treatment also praised the action, while also criticizing the plot, stating that he "couldn't get a handle on the story". Contrary to other reviewers, Mathew Warner from The Fandom Post praised the plot, stating it "can be a lot of fun" and calling the series over a "fairly enjoyable read". Erkael from Manga News also offered praise for the action, while also criticizing the art for being generic.

References

External links
 

Action anime and manga
Christianity in popular culture
Fantasy anime and manga
Gangan Comics manga
Romance anime and manga
Shōnen manga
Thriller anime and manga
Vampires in anime and manga
Yen Press titles